The Steel Woods are an American country music group. from Nashville, Tennessee. Their debut album, Straw in the Wind, was released in 2017.

The band has cited influences such as Willie Nelson, Waylon Jennings and Led Zeppelin, and have toured in support of artists such as Lynyrd Skynyrd, Dwight Yoakam, Jamey Johnson, Cody Jinks, Miranda Lambert, and Blackberry Smoke.

Founding member and guitarist Jason "Rowdy" Cope died on January 16, 2021.

History 
The Steel Woods were cofounded by Wes Bayliss, Jason "Rowdy" Cope, and business partner Derek Stanley. Cope was the creative lead of the band as well as its lead guitarist, songwriter and co-producer, while Bayliss is a multi-instrumentalist, lead singer and co-producer.

Bayliss grew up in Woodland, Alabama, playing music in his family's gospel band and learned to play harmonica, mandolin, and guitar. In 2007, he moved to Mobile, Alabama, where he experimented further on different instruments. Cope began to learn guitar at the age of 11 in his hometown of Black Mountain, North Carolina. He later worked as a Los Angeles-based musician before moving to Nashville in 2007 and joined Jamey Johnson's band. In his nine years with Johnson, Cope co-wrote "Can't Cash My Checks" and helped Johnson make the Grammy-nominated "That Lonesome Song" (2008) and "The Guitar Song" (2010).

In the early days of The Steel Woods, Bayliss and Cope spent a lot of time fishing and writing what would eventually evolve into the bands first studio album, Straw in the Wind (2017) released on Thirty Tigers/Woods Music. The album featured a guest vocal appearance by Lindi Ortega, and Brent Cobb also contributed as a songwriter. On June 10, 2017, it reached number 42 on the Billboard Independent Albums chart.

In the subsequent years, the band toured with fellow Southern rock artists Cody Johnson, Cody Jinks, Whiskey Myers, and Blackberry Smoke as well as inspirations such as Lynyrd Skynyrd and Miranda Lambert.

They recorded their second album, Old News, in Asheville at the site of an old church during a break in their touring schedule. The album was released on January 18, 2019.

Cope died in January 2021. The band's third album, All of Your Stones, was released in May 2021.

Personnel 
 Wes Bayliss – guitar and vocals
 Jason Cope – guitar (d. 2021) 
 Johnny Stanton – bassist
 Tyler Powers – guitar

Discography
Albums
Straw in the Wind (2017)
Old News (2019)
All of Your Stones (2021)

See also
 List of country music performers

References

External links
 Spotify
 Apple Music 
 Pandora
 Google Play Music
 

American country rock groups
Musical groups established in 2016
2016 establishments in Tennessee
Musical groups from Nashville, Tennessee